Archive of Our Own (often shortened to AO3) is a nonprofit open source repository for fanfiction and other fanworks contributed by users. The site was created in 2008 by the Organization for Transformative Works and went into open beta in 2009. , Archive of Our Own hosts 10,220,000 works in over 54,020 fandoms. The site has received positive reception for its curation, organization and design, mostly done by readers and writers of fanfiction.

History and operations 
In 2007, a website called FanLib was created with the goal of monetizing fanfiction. Fanfiction was authored primarily by women, and FanLib, which was run entirely by men, drew criticism. This ultimately led to the creation of the nonprofit Organization for Transformative Works (OTW) which sought to record and archive fan cultures and works. OTW created Archive of Our Own (abbreviated AO3) in October 2008 and established it as an open beta on 14 November 2009. The site's name was derived from a blog post by the writer Naomi Novik who, responding to FanLib's lack of interest in fostering a fannish community, called for the creation of "An Archive of One's Own." The name is inspired by the essay A Room of One's Own by Virginia Woolf, in which Woolf said that a writer needed space, time, and resources in order to create. AO3 defines itself primarily as an archive and not an online community.

By 2013, the site's annual expenses were about $70,000. Fanfiction authors from the site held an auction via Tumblr that year to raise money for Archive of Our Own, bringing in $16,729 with commissions for original works from bidders. In 2018, the site's expenses were budgeted at approximately $260,000.

Archive of Our Own runs on open source code programmed almost exclusively by volunteers in the Ruby on Rails web framework. The developers of the site allow users to submit requests for features on the site via a Jira dashboard. AO3 has approximately 700 volunteers, who help the organization by working on volunteer committees. Each of these committees, which include AO3 Documentation, Communications, Policy & Abuse, and Tag Wrangling, manages a part of the site.

Features 
Archive of Our Own allows writers to publish any content, so long as it is legal. This allowance was developed as a reaction to the policies of other popular fanfiction hosts such as LiveJournal, which at one time began deleting the accounts of fic writers who wrote what the site considered to be pornography, and FanFiction.Net, which disallows numerous types of stories including any that repurpose characters originally created by authors who disapprove of fanfiction.

Archive of Our Own allows users to rate their stories by intended reader age ("General Audiences", "Teen And Up Audiences", "Mature", and "Explicit"), by character relationship(s), and by the sexual orientation(s) and pairings of featured characters ("F/F", "M/M", "F/M", "Multi", "Other", and "Gen"). The archive also asks writers to supply content warnings that might apply to their works ("Graphic Depictions Of Violence", "Major Character Death", "Rape/Non-Con", and "Underage").

Works on Archive of Our Own can be sorted into categories and tagged based on elements of the stories, including characters and ships involved, as well as other specific tags. Writers are free to choose whatever tags they like for their stories without restrictions on tag length, spaces, characters, or non-Roman characters. Approximately 300 volunteers called "tag wranglers" manually connect synonymous tags to bolster the site's search system, allowing it to understand "mermaids", "mermen", and "merfolk" as constituents of the "merpeople" tag, as an example. Users of the site can then search for works based on tags, fandoms, ratings, etc. in a curated folksonomy.

Readers can give stories kudos, which function similarly to likes or hearts on other sites; kudos are permanent and cannot be taken back. Readers can also leave comments, make public or private bookmarks and subscribe to series and writers. Registered users can also create moderated or unmoderated 'collections', which are used to store a set of works in one place. 

The site does not require users to sign up using their legal names, allowing the use of usernames. In addition, users may identify themselves by one or more pseudonyms, referred to as "pseuds", linked to their central account. In order to sign up, users must request an invitation which will be sent to their email addresses. The invitation system is a metered signup queue to protect the website from spammers and mass influxes of users.

Content 
Archive of Our Own maintains a policy of "maximum inclusiveness" and minimal content censorship, which means that they do not dictate what kinds of work can be posted to the archive. This openness has led to the hosting of controversial content including works depicting rape, incest, and pedophilia. According to AO3 Policy and Abuse Chair Matty Bowers, a small fraction (1,150) stories submitted to the Archive were flagged by users as "offensive". Organization for Transformative Works Legal Committee volunteer Stacey Lantagne has stated that: "The OTW's mission is to advocate on behalf of transformative works, not just the ones we like." Via the OTW's Open Doors project, launched in 2012, stories from older and defunct fic archives are imported to Archive of Our Own with an aim to preserving fandom history. The site is also open to fully original, non-fanfiction content, hosting over 185,000 such original works .

AO3 reached one million fanworks (including stories, art pieces, and podcast fic recordings, referred to as podfics) in February 2014. At that time, the site hosted works representing 14,353 fandoms, the largest of which were the Marvel Cinematic Universe (MCU), Supernatural, Sherlock, and Harry Potter. In July 2019 it was announced that the site had 2 million registered users and 5 million posted works. Of the top 100 character pairings written about in fic on the site in 2014, 71 were male/male slash fiction and the majority of character pairings featured white characters. In 2016, about 14% of fic hosted on the site took place in an alternative universe (often shortened to AU) in which characters from a particular canon are transplanted into a different context. The length of a story on Archive of Our Own tends to correlate with its popularity. Stories of 1,000 words often received fewer than 150 hits on average while stories that were closer in length to a novel were viewed closer to 1,500 times apiece.

Reception 
In 2012 Aja Romano and Gavia Baker-Whitelaw of The Daily Dot described Archive of Our Own as "a cornerstone of the fanfic community," writing that it hosted content that other sites like FanFiction.Net and Wattpad deemed inappropriate and was more easily navigable than Tumblr.

Time listed Archive of Our Own as one of the 50 best websites of 2013, describing it as "the most carefully curated, sanely organized, easily browsable and searchable nonprofit collection of fan fiction on the Web".

According to Casey Fiesler, Shannon Morrison, and Amy S. Bruckman, Archive of Our Own is a rare example of a value-sensitive design that was developed and coded by its target audience, namely writers and readers of fanfiction. They wrote that the site serves as a realization of feminist HCI (an area of human–computer interaction) in practice, despite the fact that the developers of Archive of Our Own had not been conscious of feminist HCI principles when designing the site.

In 2019, Archive of Our Own was awarded a Hugo Award in the category of Best Related Work, a category whose purpose is to recognize science fiction–related work that is notable for reasons other than fictional text. Fiesler wrote positively of the nomination: "...its nomination signals a greater respect for both fan fiction as an art form and for the creators and users of this remarkable platform. It’s a recognition of the power of these diverse spaces and voices that have, for so long, been marginalized—both in genre fiction and in computing."

Censorship

Xiao Zhan controversy 

On 29 February 2020, Archive of Our Own was blocked in China, after fans of Chinese actor Xiao Zhan reported the website for hosting an explicit fan fiction novel with graphic sketches. The banning of the site led to several incidents and controversies online, in the Chinese entertainment industry, as well as to professional enterprises, due to heavy backlash from mainland Chinese users of Archive of Our Own. Users called for boycott against Xiao Zhan, his fans, endorsed products, luxury brands, and other Chinese celebrities involved with the actor.

Germany 
On 13 December 2022, the site was indexed by the German Federal Department for Media Harmful to Young Persons due to "child pornography content", temporarily removing it from Google search results. In January 2023, the restrictions were lifted as a result of administrative errors.

References

Further reading 
 
 
 How has AO3 fandom changed in the past year? (12 August 2016)
 Kudos, comments, hits, bookmarks, and word count: what’s “average” on AO3? (17 November 2014)
 'Archive Of Our Own' Fanfiction Website Is Up For A Hugo Award NPR All Things Considered (16 August 2019)

External links 
 

2008 establishments in the United States
Fan fiction
Internet properties established in 2008
Hugo Award for Best Related Work-winning works